Corinth is an unincorporated community in Randolph County, Alabama, United States, located  north-northwest of Wedowee.

References

Unincorporated communities in Randolph County, Alabama
Unincorporated communities in Alabama